Philip, also Phillip, is a male given name, derived from the Greek  (Philippos, lit. Prominent Philips who popularized the name include kings of Macedonia and one of the apostles of early Christianity.

Philip has many alternative spellings. One derivation often used as a surname is Phillips. It was also found during ancient Greek times with two Ps as Philippides and Philippos. It has many diminutive (or even hypocoristic) forms including Phil, Philly, Lip, Pip, Pep or Peps. There are also feminine forms such as Philippine and Philippa.

Antiquity

Kings of Macedon
 Philip I of Macedon
 Philip II of Macedon, father of Alexander the Great
 Philip III of Macedon, half-brother of Alexander the Great
 Philip IV of Macedon
 Philip V of Macedon

New Testament
 Philip the Apostle
 Philip the Evangelist

Others
 Philippus of Croton (c. 6th century BC) Olympic victor and legendary hero
 Philip of Opus, one of Plato's students
 Philip of Acarnania, physician
 Philip (son of Antipater), general of Alexander the Great
 Philip (son of Machatas) builder of Alexandria on the Indus
 Philip (first husband of Berenice I of Egypt), son of Amyntas and first husband of Berenice I
 Philip, brother of Lysimachus and youngest son of Agathocles of Pella
 Philip, one of the sons of Lysimachus from his wife Arsinoe II
 Philip (satrap), Greek satrap of Sogdiana and governor of Parthia
 Philip I Philadelphus, ruler of the Hellenistic Seleucid kingdom
 Philip II Philoromaeus, last ruler of the Hellenistic Seleucid kingdom
 Lucius Marcius Philippus (disambiguation), multiple Roman statesmen
 Philippides of Paiania, Greek son of Philomelos, archon of nobility, basileus 293/2 B.C.
 Herod Philip I, son of Herod the Great and husband of Herodias
 Herod Philip II, "the Tetrarch", son of Herod the Great and ruler of Ituraea and Trachonitis
 Philippus of Thessalonica, epigrammatic Greek poet and compiler of an Anthology
 Philip the Arab, Roman emperor from 244 to 250
 Philip of Side, Byzantine historian of the early Christian church

Rulers and royalty

Papacy
 Antipope Philip (c. 701 – c. 800)

Byzantine Empire
 Philippikos Bardanes (r. 711–713), Byzantine emperor
 Philip of Courtenay, titular Latin Emperor of Constantinople (1273–1283)

King of Belgium
 Philip of Belgium

Kings of France
 Philip I of France
 Philip II of France
 Philip III of France, "the Bold"
 Philip IV of France, "the Fair"; also known as Philip I of Navarre
 Philip V of France, "the Tall"; also known as Philip II of Navarre
 Philip VI of France, "the Fortunate"

Kings of Navarre
 Philip I of Navarre, also known as Philip IV of France
 Philip II of Navarre, also known as Philip V of France
 Philip III of Navarre

King of Germany
 Philip of Swabia, King of Germany (r. 1198–1208) and Duke of Swabia

Counts and Dukes of Savoy
 Philip I, Count of Savoy (1207–1285)
 Philip II, Duke of Savoy (1438–1497)

Dukes of Burgundy
 Philip I, Duke of Burgundy
 Philip the Bold, also known as Philip II, Duke of Burgundy
 Philip the Good, also known as Philip III, Duke of Burgundy

Kings of Castile and Spain
 Philip I of Castile, "the Handsome"; also known as Philip IV, Duke of Burgundy
 Philip II of Spain, also known as Philip I of Portugal and Philip V of Burgundy
 Philip III of Spain, also known as Philip II of Portugal and Philip VI of Burgundy
 Philip IV of Spain, also known as Philip III of Portugal and Philip VII of Burgundy
 Philip V of Spain
 Philip VI of Spain

Kings of Portugal
 Philip I of Portugal, also known as Philip II of Spain and Philip V of Burgundy
 Philip II of Portugal, also known as Philip III of Spain and Philip VI of Burgundy
 Philip III of Portugal, also known as Philip IV of Spain and Philip VII of Burgundy

Others
 Philip of Sweden, a medieval king of Sweden
 Philip of Milly, seventh Grand Master of the Knights Templar
 Philip, Count of Flanders
 Philip of Artois (1269–1298), heir to the countship
 Philip of Artois, Count of Eu
 Philip I, Prince of Taranto
 Philip II, Prince of Taranto
 Philip of Burgundy, Count of Auvergne
 Philip of Poitou, Prince-Bishop of Durham
 Philip Simonsson, claimant to the throne of Norway
 Philip of Saint-Pol, Duke of Brabant
 Philip, Duke of Parma
 Philip I, Landgrave of Hesse
 Philip II, Duke of Pomerania (1573–1618)
 Prince Philip, Duke of Edinburgh (1921–2021), prince consort of Elizabeth II of the United Kingdom
 Philipp, Prince of Eulenburg, Prussian diplomat
 Prince Carl Philip, prince of Sweden and Duke of Värmland

First name
 Metacomet (1638-1676), nicknamed "King Philip", war leader of the Wampanoag in "King Philip's War"
 Phiiliip (born 1980), American musician, born Philip Guichard
 Phil Anselmo (born 1968), American heavy metal vocalist and musician
 Phil Barker (born 1932), American wargames designer
 Phil Coleman (athlete) (1931–2021), American runner
 Phil Coleman (footballer) (born 1960), English footballer
 Phil Collins (born 1951), English drummer and singer-songwriter
 Phil Cunningham (born 1960), Scottish accordionist
 Phil Farbman (1924–1996), American basketball player
 Phil Foden (born 2000), English footballer
 Phil Foglio (born 1956), print and online comic artist, creator of Girl Genius and XXXenophile
 Phil Goff (born 1953), New Zealand politician
 Phil Handler (1908-1968), American football player
 Phil Hartman (1948–1998), American actor and comedian
 Phil Haynes (born 1995), American football player
 Phil Hellmuth (born 1964), American poker player
 Phil Hill (1927-2008), American automobile racer
 Phil Ivey (born 1977), American poker player
 Phil Jackson (born 1945), American basketball coach
Phil Jurkovec (born 1999), American football player
 Phil Keoghan (born 1967), New Zealand-born television personality, known for hosting The Amazing Race
 Phil LaMarr (born 1967), American actor
 Phil Lester (born 1987), English YouTuber and BBC Radio 1 presenter
 Phil Lynott (1949-1986), Irish vocalist, bassist, and member of Thin Lizzy
 Phil Mahre (born 1957), American alpine skier
 Phil Marsh (born 1986), English footballer
 Phil McGraw (born 1950), American talk show host, also known as Dr. Phil
 Phil Mickelson (born 1970), American golfer
 Phil Murphy (born 1957), American politician
 Phil Neville (born 1977), English footballer
 Phil Ochs (1940-1976), American songwriter and protest singer
 Phil Oestricher (1931-2015), American test pilot
 Phil Palmer (born 1952), English jazz and rock guitarist
 Phil Plait (born 1964), American astronomer
 Phil Radford (born 1976), Greenpeace executive director
 Phil Read (1939–2022), English retired motorcycle racer, former world champion
 Phil Rudd (born 1954), Australian drummer for AC/DC
 Phil Taylor (born 1960), English darts player
 Phil Vickery (born 1976), English rugby player
 Phil Weintraub (1907–1987), American baseball player
 Philip Baldi (born 1946), American linguist and classical scholar
 Philip Carey (1925–2009), American actor
 Philip Chen Nan-lok (born 1955), Hong Kong businessman
 Philip P. Cohen (1908-1993), American chemist and researcher
 Philip Coppens (disambiguation), several people
 Philip Craven (born 1950), English sports administrator, president of the International Paralympic Committee
 Philip Dulebohn (born 1973), American figure skater
 Philip Erenberg (1909–1992), American gymnast and Olympic silver medalist
 Philip Farkas (1914-1992), American horn player
 Philip Glass (born 1937), American composer
 Philip Gunawardena (1901-1972), Sri Lankan Sinhala Trotskyist
 Philip Guston (1913-1980), American painter
 Philip Hamilton (1782-1801), American poet and son of Alexander Hamilton
 Philip Hearnshaw, (1952–2012), Australian filmmaker
 Philip J. Ivanhoe (born 1954), American sinologist
 Philip Jalalpoor, (born 1993), German basketball player
 Philip K. Dick (1928–1982), American science fiction writer
 Philip Khuri Hitti (1886–1978), Lebanese academic and scholar of Islam
 Philip Langridge (1939–2010), English tenor
 Sir Philip Miles, 2nd Baronet (1825-1888), English politician and landowner
 Philip Napier Miles (1865-1935), English composer, philanthropist and landowner
 Philip of Montfort, Lord of Castres, French nobleman
 Philip of Montfort, Lord of Tyre, French nobleman
 Philip George Owston (1921–2001), English chemist and crystallographer, and namesake of the Owston Islands in Antarctica
 Philip Perry (born 1964), acting Associate Attorney General of the United States
 Philip Pullman, (born 1946), English writer
 Philip Rivers (born 1981), American football player
 Philip Roller (born 1994), Thai footballer
 Philip Roth (1933–2018), American novelist
 Philip Glenister (born 1963), English actor
 Philip Seymour Hoffman (1967–2014), American actor
 Philip van Ness Myers (1846–1937), American historian
 Philip Vellacott (1907–1997), English academic and classical scholar, known for his translations of Greek tragedy
 Philip Webster (born 1949), English journalist
 Philip Wilson (bishop) (1950–2021), English-Australian bishop and prisoner
 Philip Wong (1938–2021), politician in Hong Kong
 Philip Zimbardo (born 1933), American psychologist and professor emeritus at Stanford University
 Phill Jupitus (born 1962), English comedian
 Phillip Buchanon (born 1980), American football player
 Phillip Garrido (born 1951), American kidnapper
 Phillip Hagar Smith (1905–1987), American electrical engineer, inventor of the Smith chart
 Phillip Hughes (1988–2014), Australian cricketer
 Phillip Carl Jablonski (1946–2019), American serial killer and rapist
 Phillip Jack Brooks (born 1978), American wrestler, ring name CM Punk
 Phillip James Dodd (born 1971), English-American architect
 Phillip Johnson (disambiguation), multiple people
 Phillip Lindsay (born 1994), American football player
 Phillip Noyce (born 1950), Australian film director
 Phillip Phillips (born 1990), American Idol season 11 winner
 Phillip Schofield (born 1962), English broadcaster and television personality
 Phillip Walsh (disambiguation), multiple people
 Phillip Whitehead (1937–2005), English politician and member of the European Parliament
 Phillip Wilcher (born 1958), Australian classical music composer
 Punxsutawney Phil, Groundhog Day groundhog
 Pylyp Orlyk (1672-1742), writer of Ukraine's first constitution

Surname
 Arthur Phillip (1738–1814), Australian admiral and governor of New South Wales, Australia
 Cornelius Becker Philip (1900-1987), American entomologist
 Emanuel L. Philipp (1861–1925), American politician and governor of the US state of Wisconsin
 Grethe Philip (1916–2016), Danish politician
 John Philip (1775–1851), Scottish missionary in South Africa
 Mary Phillip (born 1977), English footballer
 Tarik Phillip (born 1993), English-American basketball player in the Israel Basketball Premier League

Country
The Philippines is a country that was part of the Spanish Empire and named after King Philip II of Spain.

Fictional characters
 Dr. Phillip Sherman, a dentist in the 2003 Pixar film Finding Nemo
 Phil, a character in the 1991 American comedy film What About Bob?
 Phil, a character in the 2000 American fantasy-comedy TV movie Life-Size
 Phil, a character in the 2009 American comedy film The Hangover
 Phil Dunphy, a character in Modern Family
 Phil Eggtree, a character from the Newgrounds game Riddle School
 Phillip Argyle, a character from South Park, and part of the comedic duo Terrence and Phillip
 Philip Banks, a character from The Fresh Prince of Bel-Air
 Phil Blumburtt, a character in the 1986 American science fiction film Howard the Duck
 Phil DeVille, a character from the Nickelodeon series Rugrats
 Phil Diffy, from the Disney Channel sitcom Phil of the Future
 Phillip Drummond, a character in the American television sitcom Diff'rent Strokes
 Philip J. Fry, the protagonist of Futurama
 Phillip Enright, the main character from The Cay
 Philip Lenox, a character in the 2001 American independent comedy-drama film Little Secrets
 Phil Leotardo, a character from the HBO series The Sopranos
 Philip Bauer, the father of Jack Bauer in the series 24
 Philip Marlowe, a detective character created by Raymond Chandler
 Phil Miller, a character in the American television series The Last Man on Earth
 Phil Mitchell, a character from EastEnders
 Phil, the Prince of Insufficient Light, a character from Dilbert
 Prince Phillip, a character from the Disney film Sleeping Beauty
 Philip, one of the two main leads in Kamen Rider W
 Phillip Chancellor II, a character in the American soap opera The Young and the Restless
 Phillip Chancellor III, a character in The Young and the Restless
 Chance Chancellor, aka Phillip Chancellor IV, a character in The Young and the Restless
 Philip Kiriakis, a character in the American soap opera Days of Our Lives
 Philoctetes, a character from the Disney film Hercules
 Phil Coulson, a character from the Marvel Cinematic Universe
 Prince Phillip III, a character from Power Rangers Dino Charge
 Philip Mannering, one of the four children in Enid Blyton's The Adventure Series
 Phillip Schrute, Dwight Schrute's son in the American adaptation of The Office
 Phil Sultenfuss, a character in the American coming-of-age comedy-drama films My Girl and My Girl 2
 Philip Traum, Satan's adopted name in the Mark Twain novel The Mysterious Stranger
 Philip the Diesel Boxcab, a character from Thomas and Friends
 Phil Winkelstein, aka Frankencelery, from VeggieTales
 Philip Wittebane, a character from the animated television series The Owl House
 Coroner Phil and Eric, two coroners in Jason Goes to Hell
 Philip 'Lip' Gallagher, in Shameless U.K & U.S

Philip in other languages 

 Afrikaans: Filip
 Arabic: فيلبس (Fīlibus), فيليبوس (Fīlībūs), فيليب (Fīlīb)
 Armenian: Փիլիպպոս (Pʿilippos)
 Asturian: Felipe
 Belarusian: Філіп (Filip), піліп (Pilip)
 Bengali: ফিলিপ (Philipa)
 Bosnian: Filip
 Bulgarian: Филип (Filip)
 Chinese(Cantonese): 腓立 (Fei4 laap6)
 Chinese(Mandarin): 腓力 (Féilì), 菲利普 (Fēilìpǔ)
 Catalan: Felip
 Celtic: Fulup
 Croatian: Filip
 Czech: Filip
 Danish: Filip
 Dutch: Philip, Filip, Filips
 Esperanto: Filipo
 Filipino: Felipe, Pelipe
 Finnish: Vilppu
 French: Philippe
 Galician: Filipe
 Ganda: Filipu
 Georgian: ფილიპ (P’ilip)
 German: Philipp
 Greek: Φίλιππος (Phílippos, Philippides)
 Gujarati: ફિલિપ (Philipa)
 Hawaiian: Pilipo
 Hebrew: פיליפ (Filip)
 Hindi: फिलिप (Philip)
 Hungarian: Fülöp
 Irish: Pilib, Feidhlim
 Italian: Filippo
 Japanese: フィリップ (Firippu)
 Korean: 필립 (Pillip)
 Latin: Philippus
 Latvian: Filips
 Lithuanian: Pilypas
 Macedonian: Филип (Filip)
 Malayalam: ഫിലിപ്പൊസ് (Philippose)
 Maltese: Pinu
 Maori: Piripi
 Norwegian: Filip
 Occitan: Felip
 Persian: فیلیپ (Filip)
 Poitevin: Félipe
 Polish: Filip
 Portuguese: Filipe
 Portuguese (Brazilian): Felipe
 Romanian: Filip
 Russian: Филипп (Filipp)
 Samoan: Filipo
 Serbian: Филип (Filip)
 Slovak: Filip
 Slovenian: Filip
 Spanish: Felipe
 Swahili: Felipo
 Swedish: Filip
 Ukrainian: Пилип (Pylyp)
 Welsh: Ffilip

See also
Philippa, feminine given name
Saint Philip (disambiguation)
Emperor Philip (disambiguation)
King Philip (disambiguation)
Prince Philip (disambiguation)

References

Surnames from given names
Masculine given names
Given names of Greek language origin
English-language masculine given names
English masculine given names
Irish masculine given names
Scottish masculine given names
German masculine given names
Dutch masculine given names
Norwegian masculine given names
Swedish masculine given names
Icelandic masculine given names
Danish masculine given names